The Purdue Memorial Union (PMU) is a student union building located on the Purdue University campus in West Lafayette, Indiana, USA. It opened in 1924 as a memorial to the Purdue students who had fought in World War I. The building includes several restaurants, lounges, and student organization offices, as well as a bowling alley and a hotel.

History

In the early 1900s, Purdue was in need of a place for students, staff, and visitors to gather in the Purdue community. The Class of 1912 began collecting funds to build a union for Purdue. Funds were collected until the start of World War I. Many men and women from Purdue had participated in the war, and some have died in it. It was decided that the union should be a memorial dedicated to those men and women. From then on, funds were collected to begin building the PMU.

Building

The PMU was opened in 1924 before it was completely finished in 1929. In the basement, a bowling alley was built in 1936. The ground floor contains most of the Union’s restaurants and coffee shops. On the main floor of the Union, there are student services as well as some lounges. There are two ballrooms where large groups can gather for special events. Located on this floor as well is the Great Hall of the Union. This is the memorial for Purdue men and women that have fought in the wars. A scale model of Purdue is located in the Great Hall of the Union. The second floor of the PMU contains many lounges and private offices.

Union Club Hotel

The first part of the Union Club Hotel was built in 1929. Since then, it has grown into a full-service hotel.

Union Rack & Roll

The Union Rack & Roll is the bowling alley located in the basement of the PMU.

Services

The PMU offers a variety of services to students, staff, and visitors as well. There are financial offices, student services, as well as many restaurants.

Purdue Student Union Board

The Purdue Student Union Board (PSUB) is a student organization that provides programs and services for students, staff, and the community of West Lafayette. PSUB was an organization before the union was built and it helped fund the building. In 1920 when the organization started it had only a few members, but it now has over a hundred.

References

External links
 PMU Official Website

Student activity centers in the United States
Purdue University campus
West Lafayette, Indiana
Monuments and memorials in Indiana